MUO or Muo may refer to the following

IATA code for Mountain Home Air Force Base in Idaho
Miss Universe Organization
Miami University of Ohio or Miami University, Oxford, referring to Miami University
Mathiang Muo (born 1987), Australian-Sudanese basketball player
Muzej za umjetnost i obrt, the Croatian name of Museum of Arts and Crafts, Zagreb
Metastasis of Unknown Origin

Former institutions
Madonna University, Okija, the founding entity for what has become Madonna University, Elele
Medical University of Ohio, which merged with University of Toledo in 2006 to become University of Toledo College of Medicine and Life Sciences, the U of T's medical school
Pioneer Interest Shares, a closed-end mutualfund from Pioneer Investments that traded on the New York Stock Exchange under the NYSE symbol MUO until October 16, 2007